Litomysl is an unincorporated community in Somerset Township, Steele County, Minnesota, United States.  The community is located near the junction of Steele County Roads 4 (SE 98th Street) and 27 (SE 24th Avenue).  Nearby places include Hope, Bixby, and Owatonna.

References

Unincorporated communities in Steele County, Minnesota
Unincorporated communities in Minnesota